Primordial may refer to:
 Primordial era, an era after the Big Bang. See Chronology of the universe
 Primordial sea (a.k.a. primordial ocean, ooze or soup). See Abiogenesis
 Primordial nuclide, nuclides, a few radioactive, that formed before the Earth existed and are stable enough to still occur on Earth
 Primordial elements, elements formed before the Earth came into existence
 Primordial narcissism, the psychological condition of prenatal existence
 Primordialism, the argument which contends that nations are ancient, natural phenomena
 Primordial (band), Irish heavy metal band

Religion and mythology 
 Primordial Greek gods, a group of Greek deities born in the beginning of our universe
 Primordial Buddha, a self-emanating, self-originating Buddha
 Primordial covenant, God's covenant with humanity in Islam

See also
 
 Primal (disambiguation)
 Primeval (disambiguation)
 Primitive (disambiguation)